Psara mysticalis is a moth in the family Crambidae. It was described by Schaus in 1920. It is found in Brazil (Rio de Janeiro).

The wingspan is about 27 mm. There is a fine outbent dark antemedial line on the forewings, as well as a dark point on the discocellular. The postmedial line is fine and dark. The hindwings have a faint postmedial line.

References

Spilomelinae
Moths described in 1920